Jaume Jardí Poyato (born 7 April 2002) is a Spanish professional footballer currently playing as a forward or midfielder for Racing Ferrol, on loan from Real Madrid Castilla.

Club career
Born in Reus, Jardí progressed through the academies of Escola de Futbol la Pastoreta and Santes Creus before a move to professional side Reus in 2012. After four years with Reus, he joined Barcelona in 2016, and his career with the youth team started brightly, scoring 13 goals in his first 8 games. In January 2020, he trained with the first team, alongside fellow youth player Xavier Mbuyamba.

After five seasons in Catalonia, and being named captain of the under-19 side in his last year, Jardí rejected a new contract with Barcelona, and took up the offer from arch-rivals Real Madrid in 2021. In doing so, he became the first player to make the switch from Barcelona B to Real Madrid B since Kiko Femenía in 2013.

In July 2022, he was loaned to Racing Ferrol.

International career
Jardí has represented Spain at under-18 level.

Career statistics

Club

Notes

References

2002 births
Living people
People from Reus
Spanish footballers
Spain youth international footballers
Association football forwards
Segunda División B players
Primera Federación players
CF Reus Deportiu players
FC Barcelona players
FC Barcelona Atlètic players
Real Madrid CF players
Real Madrid Castilla footballers
Racing de Ferrol footballers